The Taça de Portugal ("Cup of Portugal") is an annual association football competition and the premier knockout tournament in Portuguese football. For sponsorship reasons, it has been known as Taça de Portugal Placard since the 2015–16 season. Organised by the Portuguese Football Federation since it was first held in 1938, the competition is open to professional and amateur clubs from the top-four league divisions. Matches are played from August–September to May–June, and the final is traditionally held at the Estádio Nacional in Oeiras, near Lisbon. The winners qualify for the Supertaça Cândido de Oliveira (or the runners-up, in case the winners are also the league champions) and the UEFA Europa League (unless they already qualify for the UEFA Champions League through league placing).

Before 1938, a similar competition was held since 1922 under the name Campeonato de Portugal, which determined the national champions from among the different regional championship winners. The establishment of the Primeira Liga, a nationwide league-based competition, as the official domestic championship in 1938, led to the conversion of the Campeonato de Portugal into the main domestic cup competition, under its current designation. In fact, the trophy awarded to the Portuguese Cup winners is the same that was awarded to the Campeonato de Portugal winners, although titles in each competition are counted separately.

The first winners of the Taça de Portugal were Académica, who defeated Benfica 4–3 in the 1939 final. Benfica are the most successful team in the competition, with 26 trophies in 38 final appearances. Porto are the current holders, after beating Tondela in the 2022 final.

History

The first incarnation of a Portuguese Cup began in 1912, as an invitational tournament organized by SC Império; it was named after the organizing club, as "Taça do Império" (not to be confused with a similarly named, but unrelated, Taça Império - the one-off trophy for the inaugural match at the National Stadium on 10 June 1944). Because of its closed format, with very few clubs taking part, the Portuguese Federation does not recognise it as a true "national cup"; it ended in 1918.

The inaugural season of the "Campeonato de Portugal" (Championship of Portugal) took place in 1921–22, and this competition was played every season until 1937–38. The original format had all the clubs participating in regional leagues, with the regional winners progressing to knock-out rounds, and the ultimate victors named Champions of Portugal. This was the primary tournament in Portugal, until the creation of the round-robin competition in 1934-35 - in fact, the Champions moniker of this early period can be misleading, as the modern concept of "champion" applies to the league champion (i.e., for statistical purposes, the winners of this Campeonato de Portugal are no longer counted among Portuguese League champions). The short period of coexistence between two championships meant considerable confusion, and was pointed as a reason for lack of competitiveness in contemporary international matches - therefore, a revamp was bound to happen.

The success of the older competition meant it was carried over after the reorganization of Football competitions in 1938–39, albeit losing its top status: the (round-robin) league carried the name Campeonato (or, in its longform, "Campeonato Nacional da Primeira Divisão"), and the old Campeonato de Portugal was renamed "Taça de Portugal" (Portuguese Cup) for the 1938–39 season. The Cup soon became the second-most important trophy in Portuguese football.

The Cup is organised by the Portuguese Football Federation (Federação Portuguesa de Futebol) and is played by all teams in the Primeira Liga, Segunda Liga (excluding the B teams), Campeonato Nacional de Seniores (excluding reserve teams), 22 District Championships runners-up and by 18 District Cups winners.

Format
As of the 2008–09 season, the cup is composed of 8 rounds (final included), with 1st level clubs joining at the 3rd round, the 2nd level clubs joining at the 2nd round and the 3rd and lower-level clubs competing from the beginning. All rounds are played in a single game, except for the semifinals.

Final venues
The final match has been played at the Estádio Nacional near Lisbon in Jamor every season since 1946, except in 1961 (in a rare occurrence, Estádio das Antas was chosen as a more convenient venue for both Leixões and FC Porto, despite being the home of the latter; an agreement was reached by both teams due to geographical proximity and capacity); in the three years following the Carnation Revolution; in the 1982–83 season, due to FC Porto's pressure. In the years following the Carnation Revolution, the venue for the final match would be the home ground of the team that had won the Portuguese Cup the previous year; however,  when Boavista won the Cup twice in a row, its home ground (Estádio do Bessa) was deemed too small and the matches were instead played in Estádio das Antas (FC Porto's former home ground).

Finals

Campeonato de Portugal (1922–1938)

Performance by club

Taça de Portugal (1938–present)

Performance by club

See also

 List of association football competitions in Portugal
 List of Taça de Portugal winning managers

Notes

References

Further reading

External links

List of Taça de Portugal winners 
Competition page at Portuguese Football Federation 
Competition page at UEFA
List of winners at RSSSF

 
Football cup competitions in Portugal
Portugal